The 2020–21 Minnesota Timberwolves season was the 32nd season of the franchise in the National Basketball Association (NBA) On February 21, 2021, the Timberwolves fired head coach Ryan Saunders after three seasons with the team. On the following day, Toronto Raptors assistant head coach Chris Finch was announced as the next head coach. After a loss to the Sacramento Kings on April 21, followed by the San Antonio Spurs defeating the Detroit Pistons the next day, the Timberwolves were eliminated from playoff contention for the third straight year.

Draft

Before the start of the 2020 NBA draft period, the Timberwolves' selection was held stuck as the #3 selection of the draft with their record being the third-worst of all NBA teams the prior season at 19–45 before the NBA suspended their season on March 12, 2020 and cancelled the rest of Minnesota's season by June 5. As a result, they held the best odds to move up at #1 alongside the Cleveland Cavaliers and Golden State Warriors for the 2020 draft, though also held odds to fall as low as the #6 pick of the draft. This year, the Timberwolves ended the 2020 NBA draft lottery with the #1 selection, moving up two spots from their initial projection. In addition to their first-round pick, the Timberwolves also held their second-round pick and gained a first-round picks from a previous trade involving the Brooklyn Nets. They traded the Number 17 pick and James Johnson for Ricky Rubio, the number 25 and 28 overall picks. They then traded the number 25 and 33 overall picks for the 23rd overall pick.

Roster

Standings

Division

Conference

Notes
 z – Clinched home court advantage for the entire playoffs
 c – Clinched home court advantage for the conference playoffs
 y – Clinched division title
 x – Clinched playoff spot
 pb – Clinched play-in spot
 o – Eliminated from playoff contention
 * – Division leader

Game log

Preseason

|- style="background:#fcc;"
| 1
| December 12
| Memphis
| 
| Jaylen Nowell (22)
| Karl-Anthony Towns (8)
| Malik Beasley (3)
| Target Center0
| 0–1
|- style="background:#fcc;"
| 2
| December 14
| Memphis
| 
| D'Angelo Russell (19)
| Karl-Anthony Towns (9)
| Karl-Anthony Towns (5)
| Target Center0
| 0–2
|- style="background:#cfc;"
| 3
| December 17
| @ Dallas
| 
| Karl-Anthony Towns (20)
| Malik Beasley (11)
| Ricky Rubio (4)
| American Airlines Center0
| 1–2

Regular season

|-style="background:#cfc;"
| 1
| December 23
| Detroit
| 
| Malik Beasley (23)
| Karl-Anthony Towns (11)
| Karl-Anthony Towns (7)
| Target Center0
| 1–0
|-style="background:#cfc;"
| 2
| December 26
| @ Utah
| 
| D'Angelo Russell (25)
| Karl-Anthony Towns (12)
| D'Angelo Russell (6)
| Vivint Smart Home Arena0
| 2–0
|-style="background:#fcc;"
| 3
| December 27
| @ L. A. Lakers
| 
| Anthony Edwards (15)
| Jarred Vanderbilt (7)
| Jarred Vanderbilt (6)
| Staples Center0
| 2–1
|-style="background:#fcc;"
| 4
| December 29
| @ L. A. Clippers
| 
| D'Angelo Russell (22)
| Jarrett Culver (10)
| Jordan McLaughlin (9)
| Staples Center0
| 2–2

|-style="background:#fcc;"
| 5
| January 1
| Washington
| 
| Malik Beasley (21)
| Ed Davis (10)
| Ricky Rubio (5)
| Target Center0
| 2–3
|-style="background:#fcc;"
| 6
| January 3
| Denver
| 
| Malik Beasley (25)
| Ed Davis (8)
| D'Angelo Russell (7)
| Target Center0
| 2–4
|-style="background:#fcc;"
| 7
| January 5
| @ Denver
| 
| D'Angelo Russell (33)
| Willy Hernangómez (8)
| D'Angelo Russell (11)
| Ball Arena0
| 2–5
|-style="background:#fcc;"
| 8
| January 7
| @ Portland
| 
| Anthony Edwards (26)
| Jarred Vanderbilt (10)
| Ricky Rubio (10)
| Moda Center0
| 2–6
|-style="background:#fcc;"
| 9
| January 9
| San Antonio
| 
| Malik Beasley (29)
| Karl-Anthony Towns (13)
| Ricky Rubio (8)
| Target Center0
| 2–7
|-style="background:#cfc;"
| 10
| January 10
| San Antonio
| 
| D'Angelo Russell (27)
| Willy Hernangómez (8)
| Ricky Rubio (6)
| Target Center0
| 3–7
|-style="background:#fcc;"
| 11
| January 13
| Memphis
| 
| Malik Beasley (28)
| Karl-Anthony Towns (14)
| D'Angelo Russell (8)
| Target Center0
| 3–8
|-style="background:#ccc;"
| –
| January 15
|  Memphis
| colspan="6" | Postponed (COVID-19) (Makeup date: May 5)
|-style="background:#fcc;"
| 12
| January 18
| @ Atlanta
| 
| D'Angelo Russell (31)
| Jarred Vanderbilt (8)
| D'Angelo Russell (7)
| State Farm Arena0
| 3–9
|-style="background:#fcc;"
| 13
| January 20
| Orlando
| 
| D'Angelo Russell (19)
| Jaden McDaniels (8)
| Jordan McLaughlin (7)
| Target Center0
| 3–10
|-style="background:#fcc;"
| 14
| January 22
| Atlanta
| 
| Malik Beasley (17)
| Naz Reid (8)
| McLaughlin, Rubio (5)
| Target Center
| 3–11
|-style="background:#cfc;"
| 15
| January 23
| New Orleans
| 
| Naz Reid (20)
| Jarred Vanderbilt (11)
| Ricky Rubio (7)
| Target Center0
| 4–11
|-style="background:#fcc;"
| 16
| January 25
| @ Golden State
| 
| Malik Beasley (30)
| Naz Reid (10)
| Ricky Rubio (11)
| Chase Center0
| 4–12
|-style="background:#fcc;"
| 17
| January 27
| @ Golden State
| 
| Beasley, Edwards (25)
| Vanderbilt, Reid (7)
| Rubio, McLaughlin (5)
| Chase Center0
| 4–13
|-style="background:#fcc;"
| 18
| January 29
| Philadelphia
| 
| Malik Beasley (22)
| Ed Davis (8)
| Ricky Rubio (5)
| Target Center0
| 4–14
|-style="background:#cfc;"
| 19
| January 31
| Cleveland
| 
| Edwards, Beasley (23)
| Jarred Vanderbilt (8)
| Ricky Rubio (8)
| Target Center0
| 5–14

|-style="background:#fcc;"
| 20
| February 1
| @ Cleveland
| 
| D'Angelo Russell (18)
| Jarred Vanderbilt (9)
| 3 players (4)
| Rocket Mortgage FieldHouse0
| 5–15
|-style="background:#fcc;"
| 21
| February 3
| @ San Antonio
| 
| Malik Beasley (29)
| Reid, Vanderbilt (11)
| Ricky Rubio (7)
| AT&T Center0
| 5–16
|-style="background:#cfc;"
| 22
| February 5
| @ Oklahoma City
| 
| Malik Beasley (24)
| Reid, Vanderbilt (9)
| Ricky Rubio (8)
| Chesapeake Energy Arena0
| 6–16
|-style="background:#fcc;"
| 23
| February 6
| @ Oklahoma City
| 
| Naz Reid (29)
| Anthony Edwards (8)
| Rubio, McLaughlin (6)
| Chsesapeake Energy Arena0
| 6–17
|-style="background:#fcc;"
| 24
| February 8
| @ Dallas
| 
| Malik Beasley (30)
| Malik Beasley (9)
| Ricky Rubio (7)
| American Airlines Center1,000
| 6–18
|-style="background:#fcc;"
| 25
| February 10
| L. A. Clippers
| 
| Naz Reid (23)
| Karl-Anthony Towns (10)
| Ricky Rubio (10)
| Target Center0
| 6–19
|-style="background:#fcc;"
| 26
| February 12
| @ Charlotte
| 
| Malik Beasley (31)
| Karl-Anthony Towns (8)
| Ricky Rubio (9)
| Spectrum Center0
| 6–20
|-style="background:#cfc;"
| 27
| February 14
| @ Toronto
| 
| Towns, Beasley (20)
| Karl-Anthony Towns (11)
| Malik Beasley (6)
| Amalie Arena0
| 7–20
|-style="background:#fcc;"
| 28
| February 16
| L. A. Lakers
| 
| Anthony Edwards (28)
| Jarred Vanderbilt (13)
| Ricky Rubio (8)
| Target Center0
| 7–21
|-style="background:#fcc;"
| 29
| February 17
| Indiana
| 
| Karl-Anthony Towns (30)
| Karl-Anthony Towns (10)
| Ricky Rubio (13)
| Target Center0
| 7–22
|-style="background:#fcc;"
| 30
| February 19
| Toronto
| 
| Karl-Anthony Towns (19)
| Karl-Anthony Towns (13)
| Jordan McLaughlin (7)
| Target Center0
| 7–23
|-style="background:#fcc;"
| 31
| February 21
| @ New York
| 
| Karl-Anthony Towns (27)
| Karl-Anthony Towns (15)
| Ricky Rubio (6)
| Madison Square Garden0
| 7–24
|-style="background:#fcc;"
| 32
| February 23
| @ Milwaukee
| 
| Towns, Beasley (26)
| Karl-Anthony Towns (8)
| Karl-Anthony Towns (8)
| Fiserv Forum1,800
| 7–25
|-style="background:#fcc;"
| 33
| February 24
| @ Chicago
| 
| Malik Beasley (25)
| Anthony Edwards (9)
| Ricky Rubio (10)
| United Center0
| 7–26
|-style="background:#fcc;"
| 34
| February 27
| @ Washington
| 
| Karl-Anthony Towns (23)
| Jarred Vanderbilt (12)
| Karl-Anthony Towns (5)
| Capital One Arena0
| 7–27
|-style="background:#fcc;"
| 35
| February 28
| Phoenix
| 
| Anthony Edwards (24)
| Karl-Anthony Towns (10)
| Ricky Rubio (6)
| Target Center0
| 7–28
|-

|-style="background:#fcc;"
| 36
| March 3
| Charlotte
| 
| Ricky Rubio (20)
| Karl-Anthony Towns (15)
| Ricky Rubio (9)
| Target Center0
| 7–29
|-style="background:#cfc;"
| 37
| March 11
| @ New Orleans
| 
| Jaylen Nowell (28)
| Karl-Anthony Towns (7)
| Ricky Rubio (8)
| Smoothie King Center3,700
| 8–29
|-style="background:#fcc;"
| 38
| March 13
| Portland
| 
| Karl-Anthony Towns (34)
| Karl-Anthony Towns (10)
| Ricky Rubio (8)
| Target Center0
| 8–30
|-style="background:#cfc;"
| 39
| March 14
| Portland
| 
| Anthony Edwards (34)
| Karl-Anthony Towns (8)
| Karl-Anthony Towns (8)
| Target Center0
| 9–30
|-style="background:#fcc;"
| 40
| March 16
| @ L. A. Lakers
| 
| Towns, Edwards (29)
| Karl-Anthony Towns (6)
| Ricky Rubio (12)
| Staples Center0
| 9–31
|-style="background:#cfc;"
| 41
| March 18
| @ Phoenix
| 
| Anthony Edwards (42)
| Karl-Anthony Towns (10)
| Karl-Anthony Towns (8)
| Phoenix Suns Arena3,172
| 10–31
|-style="background:#fcc;"
| 42
| March 19
| @ Phoenix
| 
| Karl-Anthony Towns (24)
| Anthony Edwards (10)
| Ricky Rubio (10)
| Phoenix Suns Arena3,124
| 10–32
|-style="background:#fcc;"
| 43
| March 22
| Oklahoma City
| 
| Karl-Anthony Towns (33)
| Karl-Anthony Towns (10)
| Ricky Rubio (11)
| Target Center0
| 10–33
|-style="background:#fcc;"
| 44
| March 24
| Dallas
| 
| Anthony Edwards (29)
| Naz Reid (6)
| Ricky Rubio (7)
| Target Center0
| 10–34
|-style="background:#cfc;"
| 45
| March 26
| Houston
| 
| Karl-Anthony Towns (29)
| Karl-Anthony Towns (16)
| Rubio, Towns (8)
| Target Center0
| 11–34
|-style="background:#fcc;"
| 46
| March 27
| Houston
| 
| Edwards, Towns (27)
| Karl-Anthony Towns (15)
| Ricky Rubio (10)
| Target Center0
| 11–35
|-style="background:#fcc;"
| 47
| March 29
| @ Brooklyn
| 
| Karl-Anthony Towns (31)
| Karl-Anthony Towns (12)
| Karl-Anthony Towns (5)
| Barclays Center1,732
| 11–36
|-style="background:#cfc;"
| 48
| March 31
| New York
| 
| Anthony Edwards (24)
| Karl-Anthony Towns (17)
| Ricky Rubio (7)
| Target Center0
| 12–36

|-style="background:#fcc;"
| 49
| April 2
| @ Memphis
| 
| Karl-Anthony Towns (30)
| Karl-Anthony Towns (16)
| Anthony Edwards (6)
| Target Center0
| 12–37
|-style="background:#fcc;"
| 50
| April 3
| @ Philadelphia
| 
| Karl-Anthony Towns (39)
| Karl-Anthony Towns (14)
| Jordan McLaughlin (9)
| Wells Fargo Center3,071
| 12–38
|-style="background:#cfc;"
| 51
| April 5
| Sacramento
| 
| D'Angelo Russell (25)
| Karl-Anthony Towns (13)
| Edwards, Rubio, Towns (5)
| Target Center1,436
| 13–38
|-style="background:#fcc;"
| 52
| April 7
| @ Indiana
| 
| Karl-Anthony Towns (32)
| Karl-Anthony Towns (12)
| Ricky Rubio (7)
| Bankers Life FieldhouseLimited seating
| 13–39
|-style="background:#fcc;"
| 53
| April 9
| @ Boston
| 
| Karl-Anthony Towns (30)
| Karl-Anthony Towns (12)
| D'Angelo Russell (8)
| TD Garden2,298
| 13–40
|-style="background:#cfc;"
| 54
| April 11
| Chicago
| 
| Russell, Towns (27)
| Karl-Anthony Towns (12)
| Ricky Rubio (9)
| Target Center1,436
| 14–40
|-style="background:#ccc;"
| —
| April 12
| Brooklyn
| colspan="6" | Postponed (Killing of Daunte Wright) (Makeup date: April 13)
|-style="background:#fcc;"
| 55
| April 13
| Brooklyn
| 
| Anthony Edwards (27)
| Anthony Edwards (8)
| Jarred Vanderbilt (3)
| Target Center0
| 14–41
|-style="background:#fcc;"
| 56
| April 14
| Milwaukee
| 
| Anthony Edwards (24)
| Naz Reid (15)
| D'Angelo Russell (6)
| Target Center0
| 14–42
|-style="background:#cfc;"
| 57
| April 16
| Miami
| 
| Karl-Anthony Towns (24)
| Naz Reid (7)
| Edwards, Towns, Russell (5)
| Target Center1,638
| 15–42
|-style="background:#fcc;"
| 58
| April 18
| @ L. A. Clippers
| 
| Anthony Edwards (23)
| Naz Reid (7)
| Rubio, Towns (5)
| Staples Center1,734
| 15–43
|-style="background:#cfc;"
| 59
| April 20
| @ Sacramento
| 
| Edwards, Russell (28)
| Karl-Anthony Towns (18)
| Ricky Rubio (11)
| Golden 1 Center0
| 16–43
|-style="background:#fcc;"
| 60
| April 21
| @ Sacramento
| 
| Karl-Anthony Towns (26)
| Naz Reid (7)
| D'Angelo Russell (9)
| Golden 1 Center0
| 16–44
|-style="background:#cfc;"
| 61
| April 24
| @ Utah
| 
| Karl-Anthony Towns (24)
| Karl-Anthony Towns (12)
| Anthony Edwards (4)
| Vivint Arena5,546
| 17–44
|-style="background:#cfc;"
| 62
| April 26
| Utah
| 
| Karl-Anthony Towns (21)
| Karl-Anthony Towns (11)
| D'Angelo Russell (12)
| Target Center1,638
| 18–44
|-style="background:#cfc;"
| 63
| April 27
| @ Houston
| 
| Karl-Anthony Towns (31)
| Anthony Edwards (9)
| D'Angelo Russell (7)
| Toyota Center3,225
| 19–44
|-style="background:#cfc;"
| 64
| April 29
| Golden State
| 
| Ricky Rubio (26)
| Karl-Anthony Towns (11)
| D'Angelo Russell (8)
| Target Center1,638
| 20–44

|-style="background:#fcc;"
| 65
| May 1
| @ New Orleans
| 
| Anthony Edwards (29)
| Karl-Anthony Towns (14)
| D'Angelo Russell (11)
| Target Center1,638
| 20–45
|-style="background:#fcc;"
| 66
| May 5
| Memphis
| 
| Anthony Edwards (42)
| Naz Reid (7)
| D'Angelo Russell (14)
| Target Center1,436
| 20–46
|-style="background:#fcc;"
| 67
| May 7
| @ Miami
| 
| Karl-Anthony Towns (27)
| Jarred Vanderbilt (11)
| Ricky Rubio (9)
| American Airlines ArenaLimited seating
| 20–47
|-style="background:#cfc;"
| 68
| May 9
| @ Orlando
| 
| Russell, Towns (27)
| Anthony Edwards (10)
| D'Angelo Russell (7)
| Amway Center4,086
| 21–47
|-style="background:#cfc;"
| 69
| May 11
| @ Detroit
| 
| Karl-Anthony Towns (28)
| Towns, Vanderbilt (8)
| D'Angelo Russell (10)
| Little Caesars Arena750
| 22–47
|-style="background:#fcc;"
| 70
| May 13
| Denver
| 
| Anthony Edwards (29)
| Karl-Anthony Towns (11)
| Edwards, Rubio (5)
| Target Center1,638
| 22–48
|-style="background:#fcc;"
| 71
| May 15
| Boston
| 
| Karl-Anthony Towns (24)
| Karl-Anthony Towns (14)
| Edwards, Russell (6)
| Target Center1,638
| 22–49
|-style="background:#cfc;"
| 72
| May 16
| Dallas
| 
| Anthony Edwards (30)
| Jarred Vanderbilt (12)
| D'Angelo Russell (10)
| Target Center1,638
| 23–49

Player statistics

After all games.

|-
| 
| 37 || 36 || 32.8 || .440 || style=background:#78BE20;color:white;|.399 || .850 || 4.4 || 2.4 || .8 || .2 || 19.6
|-
| 
| 34 || 7 || 14.7 || .411 || .245 || .604 || 3.1 || .7 || .5 || .3 || 5.3
|-
| 
| 23 || 7 || 13.0 || .432 || .000 || .833 || 5.0 || .9 || .6 || .6 || 2.1
|-
| 
| style=background:#78BE20;color:white;|72 || style=background:#78BE20;color:white;|55 || 32.1 || .417 || .329 || .776 || 4.7 || 2.9 || 1.1 || .5 || 19.3
|-
| ‡
| 2 || 0 || 2.0 || .000 || .000 || .000 || .0 || .0 || .0 || .0 || .0
|-
| 
| 52 || 6 || 17.3 || .435 || .327 || .619 || 3.9 || .7 || .4 || .1 || 7.2
|-
| 
| 45 || 11 || 13.9 || .495 || .295 || .703 || 1.5 || .6 || .6 || .4 || 5.1
|-
| 
| 63 || 27 || 24.0 || .447 || .364 || .600 || 3.7 || 1.1 || .6 || 1.0 || 6.8
|-
| 
| 51 || 2 || 18.4 || .413 || .359 || .767 || 2.1 || 3.8 || 1.0 || .1 || 5.0
|-
| 
| 42 || 0 || 18.1 || .424 || .333 || .818 || 2.3 || 1.5 || .5 || .3 || 9.0
|-
| 
| 59 || 37 || 20.3 || .402 || .269 || .769 || 2.6 || 1.1 || .9 || .5 || 5.4
|-
| 
| 70 || 15 || 19.2 || .523 || .351 || .693 || 4.6 || 1.0 || .5 || style=background:#78BE20;color:white;|1.1 || 11.2
|-
| 
| 68 || 51 || 26.1 || .388 || .308 || style=background:#78BE20;color:white;|.867 || 3.3 || style=background:#78BE20;color:white;|6.4 || style=background:#78BE20;color:white;|1.4 || .1 || 8.6
|-
| 
| 42 || 26 || 28.5 || .431 || .387 || .765 || 2.6 || 5.8 || 1.1 || .4 || 19.0
|-
| 
| 50 || 50 || style=background:#78BE20;color:white;|33.8 || .486 || .387 || .859 || style=background:#78BE20;color:white;|10.6 || 4.5 || .8 || style=background:#78BE20;color:white;|1.1 || style=background:#78BE20;color:white;|24.8
|-
| 
| 64 || 30 || 17.8 || style=background:#78BE20;color:white;|.606 || .200 || .559 || 5.8 || 1.2 || 1.0 || .7 || 5.4
|}
‡Waived during the season

Transactions

Trades

Free agency

Re-signed

Additions

Subtractions

References

2020-21
Minnesota Timberwolves
2020 in sports in Minnesota
2021 in sports in Minnesota